The women's road race, one of the cycling events at the 2012 Olympic Games in London, took place on 29 July over a course starting and ending on The Mall and heading out of London into Surrey. Nicole Cooke of Great Britain was the defending champion.

In heavy rain, the race and gold medal was won by Marianne Vos of the Netherlands. Great Britain's Lizzie Armitstead was second, collecting silver, and Russia's rider Olga Zabelinskaya won the bronze in third place.

Start list
The provisional start list of 67 riders was published on 23 July. The final start list of 66 riders was corrected by the removal of Lee Wai Sze of Hong Kong to leave Hong Kong with the one place they had obtained under the qualification system, and the German team decided to replace Claudia Häusler with Charlotte Becker.

Race
The race started at 12:00 British Summer Time (UTC+01:00). The weather was cool and it was very rainy. At both the start and finish of the race it was pouring down with rain. Due to the bad weather, the race saw a lot of punctures and incidents which caused riders to lose valuable time.

After an unsuccessful attack from Janildes Silva Fernandes, Ellen van Dijk attacked after around 35 kilometres. A couple of other riders joined Van Dijk in her escape but the efforts were not successful, as the escapees were caught by the group. A few minutes later, Ellen van Dijk attacked again in an attempt to splinter the peloton but was soon reeled in again. After two short bursts from Ellen van Dijk and one from Loes Gunnewijk, the American Kristin Armstrong attacked on the climb of Box Hill, followed by Great Britain's Emma Pooley. When the bunch was back together, race favourite Marianne Vos attacked but was immediately followed by America's Shelley Olds and the bunch. After other attacks from Ellen van Dijk, Judith Arndt, Emma Pooley and Ellen van Dijk respectively, the bunch contained about 35 riders with 50 kilometers to go. At the beginning of the second of the two rounds of Box Hill, Marianne Vos attacked the bunch, joined by Lizzie Armitstead and the Belarus rider Alena Amialiusik but were unable to get away. After the descent of Box Hill there was a clear escape of Marianne Vos, Olga Zabelinskya, Lizzie Armitstead and Shelley Olds, who quickly made a gap of half a minute between themselves and the chasing posse. After a puncture of Shelley Olds the three remaining riders increased the distance between them and their pursuers to 48 seconds with 10 kilometres to go. After Zabelinskaya tried unsuccessful to escape with 2 kilometres to go, it was Vos who sprinted for the finish with about 200 metres to go. Armitstead tried to get after her but failed to do so and was beaten by a bike-length.

Final classification
In the table below, "s.t." indicates that the rider crossed the finish line in the same group as the cyclist before her, and was therefore credited with the same finishing time.

Over time limit (OTL)
Under UCI regulations for one-day road races (article 2.3.039), "Any rider finishing in a time exceeding that of the winner by more than 5% shall not be placed". Applying this to the winning time of Marianne Vos resulted in a time limit of 3:45:15.

Gallery

References

External links

Women's Road Race  at the London 2012 website

Women's road race
2012 in women's road cycling
Cycling at the Summer Olympics – Women's road race
Women's events at the 2012 Summer Olympics
2012 Women's Cycling